The Santa Clause 3: The Escape Clause is a 2006 American Christmas comedy film directed by Michael Lembeck. It is the third installment in The Santa Clause franchise, following The Santa Clause (1994) and The Santa Clause 2 (2002). The film features Tim Allen returning as Scott Calvin, who must find a way to reverse a spell cast by Jack Frost (Martin Short) that caused him to lose his title of Santa Claus. Allen and Short had previously worked together in the 1997 Disney comedy film, Jungle 2 Jungle. Most of the supporting actors from the first two films reprise their roles, with the exception of David Krumholtz. As a result of his absence, Curtis (played by Spencer Breslin), who was previously the Assistant Head Elf, has now been promoted to Bernard's former position. This was Peter Boyle's final film to be released during his lifetime (2008's All Roads Lead Home was released posthumously). Its production was completed in February 2006.

The film was released in theaters on November 3, 2006 in the United States and grossed $110 million worldwide. It received negative reviews from critics, with Rotten Tomatoes calling it "a bag of bland gags and dumb slapstick."

Plot 

Twelve years have passed since Scott Calvin took on the mantle of Santa Claus and married Carol Newman, who is now a teacher in the North Pole. On Christmas Eve, she tells a group of young elves a story from her life with Scott while expecting their first child. Scott invites his in-laws, Sylvia and Bud Newman, to the North Pole, along with Scott's ex-wife Laura, her husband Neil, their daughter Lucy, and Scott's son Charlie. Meanwhile, he is summoned to a meeting of the Council of Legendary Figures, consisting of Mother Nature, Father Time, the Easter Bunny, Cupid, the Tooth Fairy, and the Sandman, concerning the behavior of Jack Frost, who is jealous that he has no holiday or special occasion in his honor. Because he has been promoting himself during the Christmas season, Mother Nature suggests sanctions against him. As Scott is attempting to get the in-laws to come without revealing that he is Santa, Jack Frost negotiates a light sentence of community service at the North Pole, helping Scott and the elves put up various Canadian-themed paraphernalia, as Carol's parents believe Scott is a toymaker in Canada; Scott consents.

However, Frost's ultimate goal is to trick Santa into renouncing his position. When now Head elf Curtis inadvertently reveals the "Escape Clause", Frost sneaks into The Hall of Snow Globes and steals Scott's one containing Scott as Santa. If Scott holds the globe and wishes to have "never been Santa at all," he will go back in time and undo his career as Santa. When Lucy discovers this, Frost freezes her parents and locks her in a closet. He then orchestrates situations that make Scott think he must resign to make things better.

Frost tricks Scott into invoking the Escape Clause and both are sent to Scott's front yard in 1994, when Scott caused the original Santa to fall off his roof and had to replace him. Frost causes the original Santa to fall off the roof and grabs Santa's coat before Scott can. Scott is sent to an alternate 2006, where he has been CEO of his old company for the last twelve years and business takes priority over family. Scott also learns that Laura and Neil divorced and Carol moved away years ago.

Scott goes to find Lucy and Neil, who are vacationing at the North Pole, which Frost has turned into a theme park. Christmas is now "Frostmas", the elves are miserable, the reindeer are confined to a petting zoo, and parents can pay for their kids to be placed on the nice list. Scott finds Lucy and questions Neil about Laura; he states that Scott’s workaholic absence in Charlie’s life put all the pressure on Neil, and Charlie didn't want him to be his father, causing the divorce between him and Laura.

Scott confronts Frost and causes a distraction and convinces Lucy to steal Frost's snow globe for him. Lucy throws the snow globe to Scott, but Frost catches it. Scott plays a recording of Frost saying "I wish I'd never been Santa at all" from a novelty North Pole pen Frost gave him earlier, invoking the Escape Clause, sending both Scott and Frost back to 1994. Scott restrains Jack long enough to let his 1994 counterpart get the coat, making him Santa Claus again, sending both back to the present in the original timeline.

Scott reconciles with his family and Jack is arrested by elf police. He reveals he cannot unfreeze his victims unless he unfreezes himself, something he says he'll never do. Scott convinces Lucy via a snow globe he had given her earlier of her warmly hugging a snowman, to give Frost a "magic hug" to unfreeze and reform him. It works, Laura and Neil unfreeze and Frost becomes a new person. The "Canada" ruse is dropped and Scott appears as Santa to Carol's parents. With two hours remaining before Santa must leave for his Christmas deliveries, Carol goes into labor.

Months later, while Carol is telling the tale to her students, Scott walks in to reveal their son, Buddy Claus.

Cast
 Tim Allen as Santa Claus / Scott Calvin
 Martin Short as Jack Frost
 Elizabeth Mitchell as Mrs. Claus / Carol Calvin
 Judge Reinhold as Neil Miller
 Wendy Crewson as Laura Miller
 Liliana Mumy as Lucy Miller
 Alan Arkin as Bud Newman
 Ann-Margret as Sylvia Newman
 Spencer Breslin as Curtis the Elf
 Eric Lloyd as Charlie Calvin
 Aisha Tyler as Mother Nature
 Peter Boyle as Father Time
 Michael Dorn as the Sandman
 Jay Thomas as the Easter Bunny
 Kevin Pollak as Cupid
 Art LaFleur as the Tooth Fairy
 Abigail Breslin as Trish
 Bob Bergen as the voice of Comet

Production
The film was shot entirely at Downey Studios in Downey, California, with Elfsburg Village being shot on Stage 1, and the suburban scenes being shot on the studio's backlot.

The looks for Jack Frost and Mrs. Claus were originally different. Frost's initial appearance was more of an English 1960's look that was more impish and elfin, but the threat level was not up to the level that director Michael Lembeck wanted. Costume designer Ingrid Ferrin designed a new costume for Frost with a velvet zoot suit feel. Mrs. Claus's initial appearance was based on her end-credits dance scene in The Santa Clause 2. In that scene, Elizabeth Mitchell wore prosthetic makeup that made her appear round and chubby. After the second day of principal photography, Lembeck was not seeing any emotional content in Mitchell's performance due to the amount of makeup applied on her.

Reception

Critical response
The site's critical consensus reads, "Playing Jack Frost as an evil cross between Liza Minnelli and Liberace, Martin Short is a welcome presence, but this tired series continues drawing from its bag of bland gags and dumb slapstick." On Metacritic, the film has a weighted average score of 32 out of 100, based on 17 critics, indicating "generally unfavorable reviews". Audiences polled by CinemaScore gave the film an average grade of "B+" on an A+ to F scale.

Erid D. Snider wrote that Allen did The Santa Clause "The first time with enthusiasm, the second time with affection and the third time for a paycheck". Kyle Smith wrote, "We're getting a turkey and a ham for the holidays. Santa is so dumb he should be demoted to cleaning up after Geoffrey the Giraffe at Toys 'R' Us." Manohla Dargis dismissed the film as "Squeaky clean, but you might die of boredom." Finally, Mark Kermode described it on BBC Radio 5 Live as "the cinematic equivalent of tertiary syphilis".

In a more positive review, Varietys Justin Chang said The Santa Clause 3 was "a much cleaner, more streamlined ride than its overstuffed predecessor", adding that "Michael Lembeck directs the action with a surer touch and more consistent tone than he brought to Santa Clause 2, and effortlessly pulls off the pic's sentimental, life-affirming moments without tugging too hard."

Awards and nominations

Box office
The first two films had become box-office successes during their opening weekends, but The Santa Clause 3 was beaten by Borat for the No. 1 spot.

The Santa Clause 3 made $84,500,122 in North America and a worldwide gross of $110,768,122. The first film made $189,833,357 worldwide at the box-office while the second film made $172,855,065.

Home video
The film was released on DVD and Blu-ray Disc on November 20, 2007.

Video game
A tie-in video game was released on November 1, 2006 for the Game Boy Advance, developed by 1st Playable Productions and published by Buena Vista Games.

Sequel television series

A television series serving as a sequel, The Santa Clauses, was released on Disney+, with Tim Allen reprising his role as Scott Calvin / Santa Claus and Jack Burditt serving as showrunner and executive producer. Realizing he can't be Santa Claus forever, an aging Scott Calvin sets off to find a suitable replacement, while helping his children get used to a new adventure south of the pole.

See also
 List of Christmas films
 Santa Claus in film

Notes

References

External links

 
 
 
 
 The Santa Clause 3: The Escape Clause at Ultimate Disney

2006 films
2000s children's comedy films
2000s fantasy comedy films
American children's comedy films
American Christmas films
American fantasy comedy films
American sequel films
Films about wish fulfillment
Films directed by Michael Lembeck
2000s pregnancy films
Santa Claus in film
Walt Disney Pictures films
2000s Christmas comedy films
American Christmas comedy films
Jack Frost
Films about time travel
2006 comedy films
Easter Bunny in film
Sandman in film
Films shot in California
American pregnancy films
2000s English-language films
2000s American films
Films scored by George S. Clinton
The Santa Clause (franchise)